Florence Aylward (10 March 1862 – 14 October 1950) was an English composer known for ballads.

Early life
Aylward was born at Brede Rectory in Brede, East Sussex, England in 1862, the daughter of the Rector of Brede, Augustus Aylward and his wife Mary, who was the eldest daughter of Thomas Frewen of Brickwall in Sussex. Aylward studied at the Guildhall School. Aylward began composing at an early age, and her songs began to be performed at local concerts when she was 12.

Career
Aylward's early composition efforts caught the attention of William Boosey, of the publisher Boosey & Hawkes. Aylward's first song was published in 1888, entitled "Day Dawn". The words were based on a translation of a Victor Hugo poem by Alice K. Sawyer, with music composed by Aylward. The Graphic described it as a "simple and graceful ballad". In 1890, a collection of six of her compositions was published for soprano under the title "Album of Six Songs", which included "The Boat of My Lover", "An Egyptian Lament" and "The Milkmaid's Song".

In total, she published at least 150 songs. Around 50 are listed in 
Padzírek's Universal Handbook of Musical Literature.

Family life
Aylward married Harold Kinder, an architect, in 1881 in Rye, Sussex. They had one son, Harold, born in 1886. Aylward's husband died in 1940.

Selected works
"Beloved it is morn"
"Call of Life"
"Love's Coronation"
"Made a Man"
"Morning and You!" 
"Song of the Bow"
"Thrush to his Love"
"For your sake"
"The Country Faith"
"Deep in my heart a lute lay hid"  
"The bird I love the best"
"Vitai Lampada" (1900, words by Henry Newbolt)

References

External links
Florence Aylward "The Window" from YouTube
The song "Aspiration" on The Art Song Project

1862 births
1950 deaths
19th-century classical composers
19th-century English musicians
20th-century classical composers
20th-century English composers
English classical composers
British women classical composers
People from Brede, East Sussex
20th-century English women musicians
19th-century British composers
20th-century women composers
19th-century women composers